Progress Energy may refer to:

In American architecture:

 Progress Energy Center for the Performing Arts, the former name of the main venue for the performing arts in Raleigh, North Carolina
 Progress Energy Park, the former name of the downtown waterfront stadium in St. Petersburg, Florida

In business:

 Progress Energy Inc, American power generation and distribution company
 Progress Energy Resources, Canadian oil and gas exploration and extraction company